The Johnson Rocket 185 was a 1940s American two seat cabin monoplane designed by Johnson and built at Fort Worth, Texas.

Development
Johnson originally built a homebuilt Rocket 125 which first flew in 1942. The Rocket 125 was a low-wing cabin monoplane powered by a Lycoming O-290 engine. He developed the design into the Rocket 185 with a 185 hp (138 kW) Lycoming O-435-A engine and retractable landing gear. It was a high performance aircraft for the late 1940s with a top speed of 180 mph (290 km/h). In August 1945, Fred Pittera who had been an Advanced Military Pilot Training instructor on the four-engine B-24 Bomber at the nearby Fort Worth Army Air Field, joined the Johnson Rocket Aircraft as a test pilot, flying the P-39 aircraft look-alike through its various test regimens and finally in late 1945 flew the Johnson Rocket 185 with an FAA flight examiner for its first production qualification approval. A Federal Aviation Authority Type Certificate was issued on 10 September 1946. Introduced in August 1945, the Rocket 185 was pitched with the phrase "get a super-performing airplane for only $5,000 – order your 'Rocket' now!". A sales tour began in June 1946. However, because of its high performance and limited seating (two, sometimes three), the market was limited to experienced pilots and only 18 were built.

A four-seat variant was produced as the Bullet 125 but all rights to the two designs were sold on in the early 1950s. The new owner of the design was the Aircraft Manufacturing Company based at Tyler, Texas. They developed a variant of the Bullet powered by a Menasco inline engine and named the Texas Bullet 205 but it was not successful.

Specifications (Rocket 185)

See also

References

Notes

Bibliography

1940s United States civil utility aircraft
Single-engined tractor aircraft
Low-wing aircraft
Aircraft first flown in 1945